Almenrausch and Edelweiss is a 1957 Austrian-West German comedy film directed by Harald Reinl and starring Elma Karlowa, Karin Dor and Harald Juhnke. It is part of the postwar tradition of Heimatfilm.

The film's sets were designed by the art director Felix Smetana. Location shooting took place in Bavaria, Upper Austria and Switzerland.

Cast 
Elma Karlowa as Ilonka Ferency
Karin Dor as Maresi Meier
Bert Fortell as Robert Teichmann
Harald Juhnke as Max Lachner
Paul Westermeier as Generaldirektor Ferdinand Meyer
Maria Andergast as Friedl Meier
Joseph Egger as Förster Fenninger
Theodor Danegger as Hotelportier Xandl
Theo Lingen as Kammerdiener Leo Amadeus Schulze

Soundtrack 
Das Hansen-Quartett - "Der starke Max aus Halifax"
Elma Karlowa and Harald Juhnke dubbed by Das Hansen-Quartett - "Ich tanz heut ohne Schuh"
Das Hansen-Quartett - "Liebling, denk an Mich" (Music by Gert Wilden)

References

Bibliography
 Anthony Bushell. Polemical Austria: The Rhetorics of National Identity from Empire to the Second Republic. University of Wales Press, 2013.

External links 

1957 films
West German films
Austrian comedy films
German comedy films
1950s German-language films
1957 comedy films
Films set in the Alps
UFA GmbH films
1950s German films